Øksendal is a former municipality in Møre og Romsdal county, Norway. The  municipality existed from 1854 until its dissolution in 1960. It had one of the smallest municipal populations in Norway.  It was located in the northern part of the present-day municipality of Sunndal, along the Sunndalsfjorden.  It included the coastal area along the fjord as well as the whole Øksendalen valley. The administrative centre of the municipality was the village of Øksendalsøra, where Øksendal Church is also located.

History
In 1854, the parish of Øksendal was separated from the large municipality of Sunndal to establish the new municipality of Øksendal. Initially, Øksendal had a population of 1,291. On 1 January 1899, the northern part of the municipality, located on the northern side of the Sunndalsfjorden, (population: 462) was separated to become the new municipality of Ulvundeid. This left Øksendal with 654 inhabitants. During the 1960s, there were many municipal mergers across Norway due to the work of the Schei Committee. On 1 January 1960, Øksendal Municipality (population: 497) was merged with Ålvundeid Municipality (population: 513) and Sunndal Municipality (population: 5,851) to form a new, larger Sunndal Municipality.

Government
All municipalities in Norway, including Øksendal, are responsible for primary education (through 10th grade), outpatient health services, senior citizen services, unemployment and other social services, zoning, economic development, and municipal roads.  The municipality is governed by a municipal council of elected representatives, which in turn elects a mayor.

Municipal council
The municipal council  of Øksendal was made up of 13 representatives that were elected to four year terms.  The party breakdown of the final municipal council was as follows:

See also
 List of former municipalities of Norway

References

Sunndal
Former municipalities of Norway
1854 establishments in Norway
1960 disestablishments in Norway